Blanca Estela Gómez Carmona (born 16 May 1962) is a Mexican politician affiliated with the PRI. She currently serves as Deputy of the LXII Legislature of the Mexican Congress representing the Mexico State. She also served as Deputy during the LIX Legislature.

References

1962 births
Living people
Politicians from the State of Mexico
Women members of the Chamber of Deputies (Mexico)
Members of the Chamber of Deputies (Mexico)
Institutional Revolutionary Party politicians
21st-century Mexican politicians
21st-century Mexican women politicians
Members of the Congress of the State of Mexico
Deputies of the LXII Legislature of Mexico